James Russell Bailey is an American business scholar, a professor of management and Hochberg Professorial Fellow of Leadership Development at George Washington University and Fellow in the Centre of Management Development at London Business School. He is the editor-in-chief of the Academy of Management Learning and Education.

Bailey was born to Buck and Mary Bailey. He completed a B.A. at Eastern Illinois University in 1984. Bailey earned a M.A. (1988) and Ph.D. (1991) at Washington University in St. Louis. His dissertation was titled Individual and situational determinants of decision making: the role of need for cognition and response mode.

Selected works 
Bailey has edited two textbooks (Handbook of Organizational and Managerial Wisdom  and International Encyclopedia of Organization Studies).

References

External links

George Washington University faculty
Living people
Year of birth missing (living people)
Eastern Illinois University alumni
Washington University in St. Louis alumni